The 2007 Surrey Heath Borough Council election for the Surrey Heath Borough council was held on 3 May 2007. The whole council was up for election and the Conservative party kept overall control of the council.

Election result

|}

Result

Bagshot

Bisley

Chobham

Frimley

Frimley Green

Heatherside

Lightwater

Old Dean

Parkside

St Michael's

St Paul's

Town Watchetts

West End

Windlesham

References

2007
2007 English local elections
2000s in Surrey